This is a list of Mexican football transfers for the 2016 summer transfer window, grouped by club. It only includes football transfers related to clubs from the Liga Bancomer MX, the top flight of Mexican football.

Liga Bancomer MX

América

In:

 
 
 
 
 
 

Out:

Atlas

In:

 
 
 
 
 
 
 
 
 
 
 
 
 
 
 

Out:

Chiapas

In:

 
 
 
 
 
 
 
 
 
 
 
 
 
 
 
 
 
 
 
 
 

Out:

Cruz Azul

In:

 
 
 
 
 
 
 
 

Out:

Guadalajara

In:

 
 
 
 
 
 
 
 
 

Out:

León

In:

 
 
 
 
 
 
 

Out:

Monterrey

In:

 
 
 
 
 
 
 
 
 

Out:

Morelia

In:

 
 
 
 
 
 
 
 
 
 
 
 

Out:

Necaxa

In:

 
 
 
 
 
 
 
 
 
 
 
 
 
 

Out:

Pachuca

In:

 
 
 
 
 
 
 

Out:

Puebla

In:

Out:

Querétaro

In:

Out:

Santos Laguna

In:

Out:

Tijuana

In:

 

Out:

Toluca

In:

 
 
 
 
 
 
 

Out:

UANL

In:

 

Out:

UNAM

In:

 

Out:

Veracruz

In:

 

Out:

See also 
 2016–17 Liga MX season

References 

Summer 2016
Mexico
Tran
Tran